Fantino is a town in the Sánchez Ramírez province of the Dominican Republic.

Sources 
World Gazeteer: Dominican Republic – World-Gazetteer.com

Populated places in Sánchez Ramírez Province
Municipalities of the Dominican Republic